Đắk Glong is a rural district of Đắk Nông province in the Central Highlands region of Vietnam. The district is home to the largest H'mong community in Đắk Nông, who migrated from the North in recent decades.

References

Districts of Đắk Nông province